The 1974 Formula One season was the 28th season of FIA Formula One motor racing. It featured the 1974 World Championship of F1 Drivers and the 1974 International Cup for F1 Manufacturers, contested concurrently over a fifteen-race series which commenced on 13 January and ended on 6 October. The season also included three non-championship races.

Defending champion Jackie Stewart did not drive in 1974, having announced his retirement at the end of the previous season.

Emerson Fittipaldi and Clay Regazzoni went into the last race of the World Championship with equal number of points, but Regazzoni dropped down the field with handling problems, so Fittipaldi's fourth place gave him the championship. This was also the first title for McLaren and the first of many titles for a team sponsored by the Marlboro cigarette brand. Fittipaldi, Ronnie Peterson and Carlos Reutemann each won three races, Jody Scheckter and Niki Lauda two each, Regazzoni and Denny Hulme, who retired at the end of the season, one each. Graham Hill ran a new team of Lolas, the larger-than-life Hesketh team entered its own car after running James Hunt in a March, and Americans Roger Penske and Parnelli Jones entered their own cars late in the season. Chris Amon's own car, like the Token and the Trojan, was not a success. Two F1 drivers died over the course of the season, Peter Revson in a practice session accident at the South African GP in March, then Austrian newcomer Helmuth Koinigg at the US GP in October.

The 1974 season was the first in which teams had permanent racing numbers from race to race, after the system had been instituted in the middle of the  previous season. The numbers were based on the teams' finishing positions in the 1973 Constructors' Championship. From this point, each team only changed numbers if they had the driver who had won the World Drivers' Championship – the winning driver taking the number 1 and his teammate the number 2, and the team that had previously had those numbers switching to the newly-vacated ones. (This made 1974 an anomaly, as there was no World Champion, since Jackie Stewart had retired. Ronnie Peterson took the number 1 as he was team leader at Constructors' Champion Lotus; when the situation arose again in 1993 and 1994,  the number 0 was used). This system meant that, for example, Tyrrell – who never again won either title – maintained the numbers 3 and 4 right through until the system was changed in 1996.

Teams and drivers 
The following teams and drivers contested the 1974 World Championship.

Calendar

Calendar changes 
The Spanish Grand Prix was moved from Montjuïc to Jarama, in keeping with the event-sharing arrangement between the two circuits.

The Belgian Grand Prix was moved from Circuit Zolder to Nivelles-Baulers, in keeping with the event-sharing arrangement between the two circuits.

The Dutch Grand Prix was moved from late July to mid June.

The French Grand Prix was moved from Charade to the newly built Dijon-Prenois circuit.

The British Grand Prix was moved from Silverstone to Brands Hatch, in keeping with the event-sharing arrangement between the two circuits.

Season Review

Race 1: Argentina
In qualifying for the opening round in Argentina, Ronnie Peterson took pole in his Lotus ahead of Clay Regazzoni's Ferrari and Emerson Fittipaldi's McLaren. Peterson led at the start, whereas fellow front-row starter Regazzoni spun, causing chaos. Fittipaldi was hit by teammate Mike Hailwood and lost two laps while repairing his car, and James Hunt inherited second whereas Peter Revson, who started fourth, retired in the chaos. Hunt spun before the first lap was over, and second place went to Carlos Reutemann's Brabham.

Reutemann passed Peterson on the third lap, and soon the Swede began to fade badly with brake problems. As a result, Mike Hailwood and Denny Hulme in their McLarens were second and third, ahead of Jacky Ickx and Niki Lauda in the second Lotus and Ferrari. Hulme, Ickx and Lauda all passed Hailwood and then Ickx suffered a puncture mid-race and had to pit. Regazzoni was recovering from his spin, and passed Hailwood soon after. Reutemann continued to lead until his engine began to misfire, with Hulme closing in and taking the lead on the penultimate lap. Hulme went on to win, with Lauda and Regazzoni completing the podium after Reutemann ran out of fuel on the last lap.

Race 2: Brazil
Fittipaldi took a popular home pole in Brazil, beating Reutemann and Lauda. Reutemann, eager to make up after his bad luck in Argentina, took the lead at the start, with Peterson up to second. Reutemann led early on, but was passed by both Peterson and Fittipaldi on lap 4. Peterson battled with former Lotus teammate Fittipaldi for the next 12 laps, until he suffered a slow puncture. Fittipaldi passed him and took the lead, whereas Peterson dropped backwards. Fittipaldi went on to take a home victory, with Regazzoni getting second and Ickx third.

Race 3: South Africa
The field went to South Africa after a two-month break. Lauda took pole position, with Carlos Pace's Surtees also on the front row. Arturo Merzario in the Iso-Marlboro team was an amazing third on the grid. At the start, Lauda took the lead, whereas surprise packages Pace and Merzario were soon swamped by the field. Reutemann was up to second, and he took the lead from Lauda on the tenth lap, and he would remain ahead for the rest of the afternoon. Regazzoni was third ahead of Fittipaldi and Hailwood, but soon Jean-Pierre Beltoise's BRM soon passed the two McLarens, as Fittipaldi began to drop back. Lauda and Regazzoni both retired very late in the race when their engines blew up, and thus Beltoise and Hailwood completed the podium behind Reutemann.

Race 4: Spain
The first European round of the championship was in Spain, and it was Lauda who took pole ahead of Peterson and Regazzoni. On race day, the track was wet but drying, and Peterson was able to beat Lauda off the line. Regazzoni and Ickx followed. The Lotuses and the Ferraris battled until Peterson's engine failed and Ickx lost a wheel which was not fastened properly after the stop for slicks. This left Lauda to take his first career win, and Regazzoni to complete a Ferrari 1–2, with Fittipaldi third.

Race 5: Belgium
The next race was in Belgium, and Regazzoni continued Ferrari's streak of poles, and Jody Scheckter's Tyrrell taking second with Lauda third. Regazzoni led in the early stages, with Fittipaldi climbing up to second in the first lap. Later, Lauda passed Scheckter for third, and this became second when Regazzoni went to the grass after an incident with a backmarker. Fittipaldi thus won the race, from Lauda, with Scheckter third after Regazzoni suffered fuel feed problems on the last lap.

Race 6: Monaco
In the streets of Monaco, Lauda and Regazzoni took the front row for Ferrari, with Peterson's Lotus behind them in third. The Ferraris motored away, with Regazzoni leading after beating his teammate off the line, with Peterson down in sixth. Regazzoni led until he made a mistake and spun off, rejoining fifth. Lauda was now leading Jean-Pierre Jarier's Shadow, Peterson and Scheckter. Peterson disposed of Jarier, and took the lead when Lauda's engine blew up. Peterson went on to win, with Scheckter taking second from Jarier.

Race 7: Sweden
The Tyrrells were dominant in qualifying, with Patrick Depailler taking the pole from Jody Scheckter, with the Ferraris of Lauda and Regazzoni on the second row. Scheckter passed his teammate to take the lead at the start, with Peterson gaining three places to jump up to second. It was all to no avail, because he retired in the opening laps with a driveshaft failure. The Tyrrells were now up front, with the Ferraris behind them. The gearboxes of both Ferraris failed and both retired, promoting James Hunt in the Hesketh to third. Scheckter duly won, with Depailler completing a dominant 1–2 for Tyrrell, with Hunt third.

Race 8: Netherlands
The Netherlands was host to the eighth round, and Lauda took his fourth pole of the year, with teammate Regazzoni alongside, and the McLarens of Fittipaldi and Hailwood next up. Lauda led from the start, will Hailwood jumping up to second. But Regazzoni took only two laps to regain second, and Hailwood was soon passed by Depailler and Fittipaldi. Depailler held third until he struggled with oversteer, and so Fittipaldi was through. Lauda won, with Regazzoni making it a 1–2 for Ferrari, with Fittipaldi getting third.

Race 9: France
Lauda took pole again in France, with Peterson in second, and Tom Pryce in the Shadow a surprising third. Lauda and Peterson maintained their positions at the start, whereas Pryce collided with Hunt and Carlos Reutemann, with all three retiring as Regazzoni took third. Lauda and Peterson battled it out in the early stages, but soon Lauda began to suffer from a vibration and Peterson was able to pass him and pull away. Peterson went on to win, with Lauda managing second, and Regazzoni third.

Race 10: Great Britain
Great Britain was host to the tenth round of the championship, and Lauda surprised no one by taking pole, with Peterson again alongside and Scheckter third. At the start, Lauda led, whereas Peterson dropped behind Scheckter and Regazzoni. The order of Lauda, Scheckter, Regazzoni and Peterson remained unchanged for the first half of the race until Regazzoni and Peterson had to pit for new tyres after running over debris. Late in the race, leader Lauda suffered a puncture, and the lead went to Scheckter. Scheckter duly won, with Fittipaldi getting second and Jacky Ickx third.

As a result, with exactly two-thirds of the championship gone, the championship was an extremely close four-way battle. Lauda led with 38 points, but he was only a point ahead of Fittipaldi, with Regazzoni and Scheckter lurking three points behind.

Race 11: Germany
The third part of the championship started in Germany at the 14.2 mile (22.8 km) Nürburgring circuit, and Lauda took pole as usual, and Regazzoni ensured that Ferrari locked out the front row, with other contenders Fittipaldi third and Scheckter fourth. Regazzoni took the lead at the start, whereas Lauda and Scheckter collided on the first lap at the Nord Kurve with the former retiring, and the latter continuing unscathed in second. Fittipaldi suffered a puncture and had to pit. Regazzoni went on to win and take the championship lead, with Scheckter second and Reutemann third.

Race 12: Austria
Lauda took his eighth pole position of the championship, and fifth consecutive, in his home round in Austria with Reutemann and Fittipaldi second and third on the grid. Reutemann got the better of Lauda at the start, with Regazzoni fourth behind the second Brabham of Carlos Pace, and Fittipaldi down to seventh behind Scheckter. Scheckter retired with a blown engine, whereas Regazzoni soon passed Pace. Lauda soon dropped down the order with a misfiring engine and soon retired. Regazzoni was second, and Fittipaldi was third after passing Pace. However. Fittipaldi's engine also blew up, and Regazzoni dropped back and ultimately had to bit with a slow puncture. Reutemann took the victory, with Denny Hulme second and James Hunt third. Regazzoni recovered to finish fifth and get two points, whereas his other rivals scored none.

Race 13: Italy
The Ferrari fans were happy to see Lauda take pole for the Italian GP, with the Brabhams of Reutemann and Pace following him on the grid. The start did not change the positions, with Lauda leading Reutemann and Pace. Soon, Regazzoni passed both the Brabhams to and then Reutemann retired with a gearbox failure and Pace had to pit with tyre troubles. This left Lauda leading Regazzoni for the perfect Ferrari 1–2, a long way ahead of third-placed Peterson. That was not to last as Lauda retired with a water leak, handing the lead to Regazzoni but Regazzoni's engine failed 10 laps later. Peterson took the lead and won, holding off Fittipaldi and Scheckter finished third to close up the championship.

Race 14: Canada
The penultimate round of the championship was in Canada, and Fittipaldi took pole, just beating Lauda with Scheckter third. Lauda took Fittipaldi off the line and led, with Regazzoni up to third ahead of Scheckter, but Scheckter retook the position on the second lap. The four contenders were occupying the first four spots – Lauda leading Fittipaldi, Scheckter and Regazzoni. But Scheckter crashed after suffering a brake failure, and then Lauda crashed out late in the race after running over debris, ending his championship hopes. Fittipaldi won the race from Regazzoni, with Peterson completing the podium.

This meant that Fittipaldi and Regazzoni were level on points into the last race, with Scheckter the outsider seven points behind.

Race 15: United States
The championship decider was to be held at the United States. Reutemann took pole with Hunt alongside on the front row, with home hero Mario Andretti third in a Parnelli. Scheckter was sixth, whereas Fittipaldi and Regazzoni were eighth and ninth. Reutemann converted his pole to a lead at the start, with Hunt second and Pace third after Andretti stalled. Behind Lauda was Scheckter, Fittipaldi and Regazzoni running together. The front three quickly pulled away, as Lauda held up Scheckter and Fittipaldi in an attempt to help Regazzoni. However, Regazzoni was struggling with handling problems and dropping back down the field. He pitted for tyres twice but found it to be no avail, and he was two laps down. Lauda and Scheckter both retired in the latter half of the race, promoting Fittipaldi to fourth. Pace took second from Hunt with four laps left, as the Englishman was suffering from fading brakes. The race was won by Reutemann, with Pace ensuring that Brabham cap off the season with a 1–2, and Hunt was third.

Emerson Fittipaldi finished fourth to ensure that he was the World Champion, beating Regazzoni by three points.

The race was marred by the death of young Austrian Helmut Koinigg when his car crashed into the wall after a puncture on the 10th lap. The barrier which the car hit split on impact, and Koinigg was decapitated.

Results and standings

Grands Prix

World Drivers' Championship standings

Points towards the World Championship of F1 Drivers were awarded on a 9–6–4–3–2–1 basis for the first six finishers in each race. For classification, only the 7 best results from the first 8 races and the best 6 results from the remaining 7 races could be retained.

The FIA did not award a championship classification to drivers who did not score championship points and did not apply a classification tiebreaker system to drivers gaining an equal number of championship points.

International Cup for F1 Manufacturers standings
Points towards the International Cup for F1 Manufacturers were awarded on a 9–6–4–3–2–1 basis for the first six places in each race, however only the best placed car of each manufacturer was eligible to score points. For classification, only the 7 best results from the first 8 races and the best 6 results from the remaining 7 races could be retained.

Race results shown in Bold in the above table indicate that points were awarded and retained. Race results shown within brackets indicate that points were awarded but not retained.

The FIA did not award a championship classification to a manufacturer that did not score championship points.

Non-championship races
The following races were open to Formula One cars, but did not count towards the World Championship of F1 Drivers or the International Cup for F1 Manufacturers.

Notes and references

Formula One seasons